The Samyang Optics / Rokinon AF 50mm F1.4 FE is a standard full-frame prime lens for the Sony E-mount. It was announced by Samyang Optics on May 3, 2016.

Though designed for Sony's full frame E-mount cameras. The lens also can be used on Sony's APS-C E-mount camera bodies, with an equivalent full-frame field-of-view of 75mm.

Build quality
The lens itself is made of a thin aluminum shell over plastic internals and includes a detachable petal-style lens hood.

This lens is in direct competition with Sony's own 50mm F1.4 prime lens, featuring similar specs and image quality.

See also
 List of third-party E-mount lenses
 Samyang autofocus lenses

References

Camera lenses introduced in 2016
50